Mool Chand Sharma is Cabinet Minister of Transport in the Government of Haryana. Apart from it, he has 3 other portfolios of Mines & Geology, Higher Education and Elections.

Sharma is the member of the Haryana Legislative Assembly from the BJP representing the Ballabhgarh Vidhan sabha Constituency in Haryana since 2014.

References 

People from Rewari district
Bharatiya Janata Party politicians from Haryana
Living people
Haryana MLAs 2014–2019
Year of birth missing (living people)